The Abrahamic Family House is an interfaith complex on Saadiyat Island in Abu Dhabi. The undertaking was inspired by the Document on Human Fraternity signed by Pope Francis on behalf of the Catholic Church and Ahmed El-Tayeb on behalf of the al-Azhar Mosque on Feb. 4, 2019 in Abu Dhabi. It houses the St. Francis Church, Imam Al-Tayeb Mosque and Moses Ben Maimon Synagogue in separate structures.

The project was announced by Abdullah bin Zayed, Minister of Foreign Affairs and International Co-operation, on Feb. 5, 2019 at a meeting of the Higher Committee of Human Fraternity at the New York Public Library.

It was officially inaugurated on 16 February 2023 by Lt. General Sheikh Saif bin Zayed Al Nahyan, Deputy Prime Minister and Minister of the Interior, and Sheikh Nahyan bin Mubarak Al Nahyan, Minister of Tolerance and Coexistence. 

The implementation of the project is supervised by the Higher Committee of Human Fraternity (HCHF). The space's design is similar to that of the Tri-Faith Commons in the US.

The Abrahamic Family House inspired an epic symphony of peace, love and tolerance "Symphony of Three" composed by Ihab Darwish, John Debney and David Shire. The symphonic performance commissioned and produced by Abu Dhabi Festival, and co-produced by Zofia Jeziorna, Ihab Darwish and Robert Townson, brought together vocal ensembles, composers and musicians from Christian, Jewish and Muslim backgrounds to celebrate dialogue among different faiths.

Purpose 

The Abrahamic Family House aims to serve as a community for inter-religious dialogue and exchange and be a physical manifestation of the Document on Human Fraternity. It will provide learning resources as well as spaces for worship.

The complex seeks to represent interfaith co-existence, preserves the unique character of the religions represented and build bridges between human civilization and the Abrahamic messages.

Design 
The design of the Abrahamic Family House has been prepared by the award-winning architectural and design firm Adjaye Associates, headed by Ghanaian-British architect David Adjaye, who unveiled the plan of the project during a New York City event.

The three cubic houses of worship sit upon a secular visitor pavilion, and aim to represent the diverse worshippers, residents, and visitors of Abu Dhabi.

Adjaye highlighted that he wanted to “create a building that starts to dissolve the notion of hierarchical difference – it should represent universality and totality – something higher, that enhances the richness of human life".

The design of this religious complex comprises three unaligned cubes sitting on a plinth, and each of them has a different orientation. The silhouette of the building makes the cubes look unified, and each of them is illustrated with colonnades, screens and vaults.

The site also includes a cultural center that will promote the values of mutual respect and peaceful coexistence while the unique character of each faith is preserved.

Naming 
The three houses of worship have been named after the Grand Imam of Al Azhar, Ahmed El-Tayeb, St. Francis of Assisi, and Moses Ben Maimon, a 12th-century Jewish philosopher and rabbinical scholar – Imam Al-Tayeb Mosque, St. Francis Church, and Moses Ben Maimon Synagogue, respectively.

See also
 Imam Al-Tayeb Mosque  - Mosque located within the complex
 St. Francis Church - Church located within the complex
 Moses Ben Maimon Synagogue - Synagogue located within the complex
 Document on Human Fraternity
 Higher Committee of Human Fraternity

References 

Interfaith dialogue
Buildings and structures completed in 2022
Religious buildings and structures completed in 2022
Mosques completed in 2022
Churches completed in 2022
Synagogues completed in 2022
Abrahamic Family House